The Men's sprint event of the FIS Nordic World Ski Championships 2015 was held on 19 February 2015.

Results

Qualification
The qualification was held at 13:35.

Quarterfinals
The quarterfinals were started at 15:45.

Quarterfinal 1

Quarterfinal 2

Quarterfinal 3

Quarterfinal 4

Quarterfinal 5

Semifinals
The semifinals were started at 16:35.

Semifinal 1

Semifinal 2

Final
The final was held at 17:10.

References

Men's sprint